Ropner is a surname. Notable people with the surname include:

Sir Leonard Ropner, 1st Baronet (1895–1977), British politician
Pamela Ropner (1931–2013), British writer
Robert Ropner (1838–1924), British shipbuilder and politician

See also
Ropner baronets, British baronetcies